Carl Albert Fritz Michael Gerlich (15 February 1883 – 30 June 1934) was a German journalist and historian, and one of the main journalistic resistors of Adolf Hitler. He was arrested, later killed and cremated at the Dachau concentration camp.

Early life
Gerlich was born in Stettin, Pomerania, and grew up as the eldest of the three sons of wholesale and retail fishmonger Paul Gerlich and his wife Therese. In Autumn 1889, Gerlich was enrolled in the Marienstiftungymnasium (Our Lady's Grammar School) and graduated from his senior class there in 1901.

In 1902 he began his studies at the University of Munich, and first majored in mathematics and natural sciences before switching to history. At the university, he was an active member of the Freistudentenschaft (Free Student Union, sometimes translated as Free Student Association). He wrote his doctoral dissertation "The Testament of Henry VI" and completed it in 1907.

On 9 October 1920, he married Sophie Botzenhart, born Stempfle, in Munich.

Career
After completing his studies with a doctorate, Gerlich became an archivist.

He also began to contribute political articles that were anti-socialist and national-conservative in the publications Süddeutsche Monatshefte, which was edited by Paul Nikolaus Cossmann, and Die Wirklichkeit (in 1917). In 1917, he also became active in the German Fatherland Party (Deutsche Vaterlandspartei) and after it was dissolved in the Anti-Bolshevist League (Antibolschewistische Liga) (1918/19).

In 1919, he published the book Communism as the Theory of the Thousand Year Reich (Der Kommunismus als Lehre vom Tausendjährigen Reich), where Gerlich compared communism with the phenomenon of redemption religion. A whole chapter in the work is devoted to denouncing antisemitism, which had gained ground because of the leading positions of many Jews in the Revolution and founding of the Soviet Union and Bavarian Soviet Republic.

Gerlich held conservative views and published several anti-socialist articles in the right-wing press.

Editor-in-chief of the Münchner Neueste Nachrichten

From 1920 to 1928 he was editor in chief of the Münchner Neueste Nachrichten (MNN), a predecessor to today's Süddeutsche Zeitung in that its circulation was one of the largest in southern Germany. As editor, Gerlich opposed Nazism and Hitler's Nazi Party as "murderous". In the early 1920s, he had seen proof of Nazi tyranny already in Munich. Once a conservative nationalist, after the 1923 Beer Hall Putsch Gerlich decisively turned against Hitler and became one of his fiercest critics. Other critics of the Nazis at MNN were later arrested within days of Gerlich, such as: Fritz Buechner, who followed Gerlich as the editor of the MNN, Erwein Freiherr von Aretin, who was domestic editor at the MNN, and Cossmann, who wrote for the MNN, all of whom had steered the MNN to support a return of the monarchy.

Friendship with Therese Neumann

By 1927, he had befriended Therese Neumann, a Catholic mystic from Konnersreuth, Bavaria, who supported Gerlich's resistance activities. Initially, he wanted to expose her stigmata as a fraud, but Gerlich came back a changed man and later converted from Calvinism to Catholicism in 1931. From that year until his death, his resistance became inspired by the social teachings of the Catholic Church.

The Straight Path newspaper

Gerlich returned in November 1929 to his job at the Bavarian National Archives. A circle of friends that had developed around Neumann gave rise to the idea of founding a weekly political newspaper to dispute the left and right political extremism in Germany. Supported by a wealthy patron, Prince Waldburg-Zeil, Gerlich was able to take over the weekly newspaper Sunday Illustrated (Der Illustrierte Sonntag), which was renamed The Straight Path (Der Gerade Weg) in 1932.

In this newspaper, Gerlich opposed Communism, National Socialism and antisemitism. The dispute with the growing Nazi movement became the central focus of Gerlich and his later writing. At the end of 1932 the circulation of the weekly was over 40,000 readers.

Gerlich once wrote "National Socialism means: Enmity with neighbouring nations, tyranny internally, civil war, world war, lies, hatred, fratricide and boundless want."

In 1932, Gerlich criticised and mocked the pseudoscientific Nazi racial theories when he published a satirical article titled “Does Hitler Have Mongolian Blood?” in an attempt to prove that Hitler was not an Aryan by suggesting that his nose was of a Mongoloid type.

Arrest and death at Dachau 
After the Nazis seized power on 30 January 1933, Gerlich was arrested 9 March 1933 and held at the Dachau concentration camp, where he died on 30 June 1934 during the Night of the Long Knives. His death was officially announced days after his arrest, and the announcement was published in the international press at the time. He was cremated and his ashes given to his wife.

Fictional portrayals
Gerlich was portrayed in the TV movie Hitler: The Rise of Evil by actor Matthew Modine. In the film, as he dictates a front-page article that warns of the danger that Hitler poses, Gerlich finishes with the words: "The worst thing we can do, the absolute worst, is to do nothing". This line is inspired by a quote often incorrectly attributed to Edmund Burke: "The only thing necessary for the triumph of evil is for good men to do nothing."

References

External links

Fritz Gerlich memorial website www.gerlich.com

1883 births
1934 deaths
Writers from Szczecin
People from the Province of Pomerania
Converts to Roman Catholicism from Calvinism
German Roman Catholics
German people who died in Dachau concentration camp
German Fatherland Party politicians
German male journalists
Executed German Resistance members
German Servants of God
Imprisoned journalists
Victims of the Night of the Long Knives
German people executed in Nazi concentration camps
German male writers
20th-century German journalists
Roman Catholics in the German Resistance